Frouros tis Anatolikis Aigialeias (Greek: Φρουρός της Ανατολικής Αιγιαλείας meaning the fortress of Eastern Aigialeia) was a newspaper that was founded in 1996 in Aigeira, Greece. It serves the entire eastern Aigialeia. Its editor-in-chief is Konstantinos Rozos.  The newspaper features local news from eastern Aigialeia.

“Φρουρός της Ανατολικής Αιγιαλείας” in Greek meaning "gard", From November 2012 its only online version aigeira.com

See also
List of newspapers in Greece

References

Aigialeia
Greek-language newspapers
Mass media in Western Greece
Newspapers established in 1996
1996 establishments in Greece
Weekly newspapers